Iveagh was a constituency of the Parliament of Northern Ireland.

Boundaries
Iveagh was a county constituency comprising part of northern County Down, south west of Belfast.  It was created when the House of Commons (Method of Voting and Redistribution of Seats) Act (Northern Ireland) 1929 introduced first-past-the-post elections throughout Northern Ireland.  Iveagh was created by the division of Down into eight new constituencies. The constituency survived unchanged until 1969, when its eastern part became part of the new Lagan Valley constituency.  It returned one Member of Parliament until the Parliament of Northern Ireland was temporarily suspended in 1972, and then formally abolished in 1973.

The original seat was centred on the town of Dromore and also included parts of the rural districts of Banbridge, Hillsborough, Waringstown and Moira.

Politics 
The seat had a substantial unionist majority and was always won by Ulster Unionist Party candidates.  It was often contested by independent Unionists, and once by a member of the Protestant Unionist Party, some of whom were able to take more than 40% of the votes cast.

Members of Parliament

Election results 

At the 1933 Northern Ireland general election, John Charles Wilson was elected unopposed.

At the 1945 Northern Ireland general election, Brian Maginess was elected unopposed.

At the 1962 Northern Ireland general election, Brian Maginess was elected unopposed.

At the 1964 by-election and the 1965 Northern Ireland general election, Samuel Magowan was elected unopposed.

References

Historic constituencies in County Down
Northern Ireland Parliament constituencies established in 1929
Constituencies of the Northern Ireland Parliament
Northern Ireland Parliament constituencies disestablished in 1973